The slender-tailed squirrel (Protoxerus aubinnii) is a species of rodent in the family Sciuridae found in Ivory Coast, Ghana, Liberia, and Sierra Leone. Its natural habitat is subtropical or tropical moist lowland forests.

References

Protoxerus
Mammals described in 1873
Taxonomy articles created by Polbot